Matthew Robert Warman (born 1 September 1981) is a British Conservative Party politician and former journalist who served as Minister of State at the Department for Digital, Culture, Media and Sport from July to September 2022. He has been the Member of Parliament (MP) for Boston and Skegness since May 2015 and was  an Assistant Government Whip from April 2019 to July 2019. He served as a Parliamentary Under-Secretary of State for Digital Infrastructure from July 2019 to September 2021.

Early life
Warman was educated at Haberdashers' Aske's Boys' School and Durham University, receiving a degree in English. He was Treasurer of Durham Student Theatre for the 2002/2003 academic year.

Career
Warman worked for The Daily Telegraph from 1999 until 2015, focusing for most of the period on technology, leading coverage of Facebook, Google and Apple, and covering the launch of products including iPhones, BBC iPlayer and the Apple Watch, as well as interviewing key figures including the founder of Amazon, Jeff Bezos, and Sir Tim Berners-Lee, the inventor of the World Wide Web.

In Parliament, Warman was a member of the Science and Technology Select Committee, and a former co-chair of the All-Party Parliamentary Group on Broadband and Digital Communication and Pictfor (The Parliamentary Internet, Communications and Technology Forum).

Warman was opposed to Brexit prior to the 2016 referendum. However, his constituency voted with the highest proportion of any constituency in the UK to leave, with 75.6% of voters casting their vote to leave. The wider county of Lincolnshire is a heavily Leave-supporting area.

Warman became an Assistant Government Whip on 23 April 2019.

Warman became a Parliamentary Under-Secretary of State at the Department for Digital, Culture, Media and Sport on 26 July 2019, serving as the Parliamentary Under-Secretary of State for Digital Infrastructure. He was replaced on 16 September 2021 by Chris Philp.

He was made Minister of State at the Department for Digital, Culture, Media and Sport in July 2022 as part of the caretaker government by outgoing Prime Minister Boris Johnson.

References

External links

 
 

1981 births
Alumni of Durham University
Conservative Party (UK) MPs for English constituencies
The Daily Telegraph people
Living people
People educated at Haberdashers' Boys' School
UK MPs 2015–2017
UK MPs 2017–2019
UK MPs 2019–present